Buprestinae is a subfamily of beetles in the family Buprestidae, containing the following genera in the tribes Anthaxiini, Buprestini, Chrysobothrini, Melanophilini, and Xenorhipidini:

 Actenodes Dejean, 1833
 Afagrilaxia Bily & Bellamy, 1999
 Afrabothris Thery, 1936
 Agaeocera Saunders, 1871
 Aglaostola Saunders, 1871
 Agrilaxia Kerremans, 1903
 Agrilozodes Thery, 1927
 †Andakhudukia Alexeev, 2008
 Anilara Saunders, 1868
 Anthaxia Eschscholtz, 1829
 Anthaxioides Cobos, 1978
 Anthaxoschema Obenberger, 1923
 Araucariana Levey, 1978
 †Archeobuprestis Bellamy, 2006
 Aristosoma Saunders, 1871
 Augrabies Bellamy, 1987
 Australorhipis Bellamy, 1986
 Balthasarella Obenberger, 1958
 Barakula Peterson, 2000
 Belionota Eschscholtz, 1829
 Bilyaxia Holynski, 1989
 Brachanthaxia Thery, 1930
 Brachelytrium Obenberger, 1923
 †Brachyspathus Wickham, 1917
 Brasilaxia Thery, 1935
 †Brevista Alexeev, 1995
 Bubastes Laporte & Gory, 1836
 Bubastoides Kerremans, 1909
 Buprestina Obenberger, 1923
 Buprestis Linnaeus, 1758
 †Buprestites Heer, 1847
 Calodema Laporte & Gory, 1838
 Calotemognatha Peterson, 1991
 Castiarina Gory & Laporte, 1838
 Ceylonaxia Bily, 1993
 Chalcangium Waterhouse, 1882
 Chalcogenia Saunders, 1871
 Chrysobothris Eschscholtz, 1829
 Cimrmanium Bily, 2009
 Colobogaster Solier, 1833
 Conognatha Eschscholtz, 1829
 Coomaniella Bourgoin, 1924
 †Cretothyrea Alexeev, 1996
 Ctenoderus Germain, 1856
 Cylindrophora Solier, 1849
 Cyrioides Carter, 1920
 Cyrioxus Hoschek, 1925
 Diadoxus Saunders, 1868
 Ditriaena Waterhouse, 1911
 Embrikiola Obenberger, 1928
 †Eolampra Zhang, Sun & Zhang, 1994
 Epistomentis Solier, 1849
 Eudiana Leraut, 1983
 Euryspilus Lacordaire, 1857
 Eurythyrea Dejean, 1833
 Exagistus Deyrolle, 1864
 †Fuesslinia Heer, 1847
 †Glaphyroptera Heer, 1852
 Hesperorhipis Fall, 1930
 Hilarotes Saunders, 1871
 Hiperantha Gistel, 1834
 Hoscheckia Thery, 1925
 Hovorigenium Bellamy, 2007
 †Illolampra Zhang, Sun & Zhang, 1994
 Jakovleviola Obenberger, 1924
 Julodimorpha Gemminger & Harold, 1869
 Juniperella Knull, 1947
 †Jurabuprestis Alexeev, 2000
 Karenaxia Bily, 1993
 Kisanthobia Marseul, 1865
 Knowltonia Fisher, 1935
 Kurosawaia Toyama & Ohmomo, 1985
 †Kzylordyina Alexeev, 1995
 Lamprocheila Saunders, 1869
 Lasionota Mannerheim, 1837
 †Lobites Tillyard & Dunstan, 1923
 †Lomatus Murray, 1860
 Madessetia Bellamy, 2006
 Maoraxia Obenberger, 1924
 Megactenodes Kerremans, 1893
 Melanophila Eschscholtz, 1829
 Melobasis Laporte & Gory, 1837
 Mendizabalia Cobos, 1957
 Merimna Saunders, 1868
 †Mesostigmodera Etheridge & Olliff, 1890
 †Metabuprestium Alexeev, 1995
 Metaxymorpha Parry, 1848
 †Micranthaxia Heer, 1865
 Microcastalia Heller, 1891
 Mixochlorus Waterhouse, 1887
 Nascio Laporte & Gory, 1837
 Nascioides Kerremans, 1903
 Neobubastes Blackburn, 1892
 Neobuprestis Kerremans, 1903
 Neocuris Saunders, 1868
 Notobubastes Carter, 1924
 Notographus Thompson, 1879
 Oaxacanthaxia Bellamy, 1991
 Panapulla Nelson, 2000
 Paractenodes Thery, 1934
 Paracuris Obenberger, 1923
 Paraphrixia Saunders, 1871
 Peronaemis Waterhouse, 1887
 Phaenops Dejean, 1833
 Philandia Germain & Kerremans, 1906
 Philanthaxia Deyrolle, 1864
 †Philanthaxoides Bílý & Kirejtschuk, 2007
 Phrixia Deyrolle, 1864
 †Protogenia Heer, 1847
 Pseudactenodes Kerremans, 1890
 Pseudanilara Thery, 1910
 Pseudhyperantha Saunders, 1869
 †Pseudothyrea Handlirsch, 1908
 Pterobothris Fairmaire & Germain, 1858
 Pygicera Kerremans, 1903
 Romanophora Bily, 2004
 Roswitha Bellamy, 1997
 Selagis Dejean, 1833
 Semiognatha Moore & Lander, 2004
 Senegalisia Bellamy, 1987
 Sinokele Bily, 1989
 Spectralia Casey, 1909
 Sphaerobothris Semenov-Tian-Shanskij & Rikhter, 1934
 Stephansortia Thery, 1925
 Stigmodera Eschscholtz, 1829
 Strandiola Obenberger, 1920
 Temognatha Solier, 1833
 Tetragonoschema Thomson, 1857
 Theryaxia Carter, 1928
 Thomassetia Thery, 1928
 Torresita Gemminger & Harold, 1869
 Trachykele Marseul, 1865
 Trachypteris Kirby, 1837
 Trichinorhipis Barr, 1948
 Trigonogenium Harold, 1869
 Xenomelanophila Sloop, 1937
 Xenorhipis LeConte, 1866
 Zulubuprestis Bellamy, 1991

References

Polyphaga subfamilies